The Japanese Canadian War Memorial is located at Stanley Park in Vancouver, British Columbia.

References

External links
 
 Japanese Canadian War Memorial in Stanley Park, Vancouver BC - Canadian Legion Memorials Cairns and Cenotaphs at Waymarking

Japanese-Canadian culture
Monuments and memorials in Vancouver
Outdoor sculptures in Vancouver
Stanley Park
World War I memorials in Canada
World War II memorials in Canada